The LPGA of Japan Tour is a professional golf tour for women organised by the Japan Ladies Professional Golfers' Association. It is the second richest women's golf tour in the world. The U.S.-based LPGA Tour is the most important women's tour, but the prize money gap has closed markedly since the American tour's total prize fund peaked at just over $60 million in 2008. While the Japan Tour is the second-most lucrative women's tour, two other non-U.S. tours, the Ladies European Tour and the LPGA of Korea Tour, rival the Japan Tour in level of competition.

Schedule

The 2023 schedule includes 38 events played in Japan.

Leading money winners

See also
List of golfers with most LPGA of Japan Tour wins
Women's World Golf Rankings
Professional golf tours
Japan Golf Association
Korean players' victories on LPGA of Japan Tour
Women's sports

References

External links
 

 
Professional golf tours
Sports leagues established in 1968
1968 establishments in Japan